Presence were a British rock band started by Gary Biddles, Lol Tolhurst, and Michael Dempsey. Dempsey and Tolhurst were founding members of The Cure, and Biddles was a former Cure roadie who previously played in Fools Dance with Simon Gallup.

In their brief existence, the band only recorded two albums. Their debut album, Inside, was released in the UK through Reality Records in 1992 and in the US through Smash Records, a subsidiary of Island Records, in 1993. They initially began recording their second album, Closer, that same year with former The Smiths producer John Porter at the helm but it wound up being shelved for a little over two decades. The album was posthumously released on 28 April 2014, a year after the death of Gary Biddles.

History
In 1990, Dempsey, Tolhurst and Biddles were recording demos together with a view to forming a new band following Tolhurst's departure from The Cure. With the addition of keyboardist Chris Youdell (of Then Jerico) and drummer Alan Burgess the band emerged in 1991 as Presence with the singles, "In Wonder" and "All I See". Dempsey received co-writing credit for "Amazed"; the b-side of "All I See", but took a background role as a session bassist, and did not appear in the band's photos or press releases. Porl Thompson also made guest appearances on guitar for some of these recordings, but by 1992 both Dempsey and Thompson were officially replaced by bassist Roberto Soave (formerly of The Associates and Shelleyan Orphan) and guitarist Rob Steen respectively. However, Dempsey received co-writing credits for two tracks on Inside. Although Inside was well received by critics, the album was a commercial failure, and led to the dissolution of the band. Tolhurst confirmed in an interview several years later that Presence had recorded a second album, which was produced by former Smiths producer John Porter. In retrospect, Tolhurst has stated he felt the band "was really too much too soon I felt for me". but he does not discount his experience with Presence either.

Since the breakup of Presence, Roberto Soave and Rob Steen have played in another band called Babacar along with Boris Williams of The Cure and Caroline Crawley of Shelleyan Orphan. Tolhurst is focusing on his current project Levinhurst with his wife Cindy Levinson on vocals.

In December 2011, Inside was made available in MP3 format through Amazon and iTunes for the first time; its track list was expanded to include the b-sides from those sessions. In March 2013, their unreleased second album Closer was made available for listening in its entirety through SoundCloud.

In February 2013, it was announced on their Facebook page that the band were in the process of writing new songs but Gary Biddles died that April. On 21 April 2014, it was announced on their Facebook page that Closer would be released on iTunes, Amazon, Google Play, and other sites.

Members
Gary Biddles — vocals
Michael Dempsey — bass guitar (early recording sessions)
Lol Tolhurst — keyboards
Chris Youdell — keyboards
Alan Burgess — drums
Roberto Soave — bass guitar (on Inside)
Rob Steen — guitar
Paul Redfern — bass guitar (on Closer)
Kevin Kipnis — bass guitar (on Closer live shows)

Discography
Inside (1992)
Closer (2014)

References

External links

Article and pictures
Band pictures
Different Cures
Interview with Gary Biddles

English new wave musical groups
English rock music groups
Musical groups established in 1990
Musical groups disestablished in 1993